Kim Nam-soon (born May 7, 1980) was a member of the South Korean Olympic archery team. She won both a gold and a silver medal at the 2000 Summer Olympics.

See also
Korean archery
Archery
List of South Korean archers

References

1980 births
Living people
South Korean female archers
Archers at the 2000 Summer Olympics
Olympic archers of South Korea
Olympic gold medalists for South Korea
Olympic silver medalists for South Korea
Olympic medalists in archery
Medalists at the 2000 Summer Olympics